The Town of Timnath is a Statutory Town located in Larimer County, Colorado, United States. Founded in 1882, Timnath is a small agricultural/farming community located southeast of Fort Collins, Colorado, approximately one-half mile east of the Harmony Road/Interstate 25 interchange, on a small bluff east of the Cache la Poudre River. The surrounding farmlands have been used primarily for potatoes, alfalfa, sugar beets, and cattle. Although the town has remained virtually unchanged in recent decades, the encroaching growth of both Fort Collins to the west and Windsor to the south have placed the town in an area considered favorable to development. The population was 6,487 at the 2020 census.  Timnath has been one of the fastest-growing communities in Colorado since 2020, and in 2021 had an estimated population of 7,839.

Description
Other structures lining Main Street (a section of County Road 5) include elementary school (in the Poudre School District), a one-story modern post-office, and several other historic buildings. Most residences are single-family homes. There is another elementary school (Bethke Elementary) 2.8 miles away from the one lining Main Street.

History

The area was first homesteaded by settlers in 1869. The first schoolhouse was constructed that year, approximately one-half mile west of the current town, and was named "Fairview". By 1880, the community had outgrown the schoolhouse, and new "Fairview" school was built just north of the current town. The school also served as an early meeting place for the Presbyterian Church. The turning point in the early history of the community was in 1882, with the arrival of the Greeley, Salt Lake and Pacific Railroad (controlled by the Union Pacific) linking Greeley and Fort Collins. The following year, the Presbyterian Church, petitioned by local residents, sent a missionary to found a congregation. The current structure along Main Street dates from that year.

A post office was established in 1884, headed by Reverend Charles A. Taylor, the local Presbyterian minister. When the post office was formed, Taylor bestowed the current name of the town from the 14th chapter of the Book of Judges, as the place where Samson went to obtain a Philistine wife. In 1900 the second school became outdated and a new one was built, dropping the name "Fairview" permanently. This structure currently stands as an out-building to the current elementary school. A larger school was built in 1918 (which burned in 1935 and was rebuilt the following year). The school district was consolidated with that of Fort Collins in 1960.

During World War II, the Empire of Japan launched Fu-Go balloon bombs that floated across the Pacific to the U.S. One of these bombs dropped and exploded in a field in Timnath.

Geography
Timnath is located at 40°31'47" North, 104°58'54" West (40.529718, -104.981654).

As of 2013, the incorporated area of Timnath comprises 5.05 square miles of land.

The historical downtown lies along County Road Five, which runs north–south parallel to Interstate 25 half a mile to the east. Since the 2000 census, the town of Timnath has annexed several square miles of land to the east and southeast; the town has experienced significant commercial development along the east–west corridor of County Road 38 (Harmony Road), including Wal-Mart and Costco. The majority of the six mile (north-south) by three mile (east-west) block of land that lies within Timnath's growth management area is low-density residential or agricultural, and is designated to remain so, with open space and parkland filling the remainder of the area, particularly near the Poudre River and Timnath Reservoir.

Government

Timnath is a Home Rule Town, governed by a Town Council, which consists of five elected officials - one Mayor and four Council Members, all positions are elected "at large," meaning that candidates come from all areas of the town. Elected officials serve 4 year terms.

Council meetings are open, public meetings where the Council makes town decisions and creates local laws and policies. The Council holds regular meetings on the second and fourth Tuesday of each month at 6 p.m. Unless otherwise noted, all meetings are held at the Town Administration Building at 4800 Goodman Street.

The Town Council appoints the Town Manager who is responsible for the administration and daily operations of the Town.

Police services are provided by the Timnath Police Department and the Larimer County Sheriff's Department. Fire protection is provided by Poudre Fire Authority.

Demographics

As of the census of 2010, there were 625 people, 214 households, and 179 families residing in the town. There were 243 housing units. The racial makeup of the town was 94.4% White, 0.6% African American, 0.0% Native American, 1.1% Asian, 0.3% Pacific Islander, 1.4% from other races, and 2.1% from two or more races. 6.1% of the population were Hispanic or Latino of any race.

There were 214 households, out of which 46.7% had children under the age of 18 living with them, 72.0% were married couples living together, 7.9% had a female householder with no husband present, 3.7% had a male householder with no wife present, and 16.4% were non-families. 14.0% of all households were made up of individuals, and 1.4% had someone living alone who was 65 years of age or older. The average household size was 2.92 and the average family size was 3.23.

In the town, the population was spread out, with 32.3% under the age of 18, 5.5% from 18 to 24, 27.7% from 25 to 44, 27.1% from 45 to 64, and 7.4% who were 65 years of age or older. The median age was 35.4 years. For every 100 females, there were 98.4 males.

In the 2009-2013 American Community Survey, the median income for a household in the town was $113,144, and the median income for a family was $114,318. The per capita income for the town was $40,889. 1.5% of the population and 1.1% of families were below the poverty line. 1.0% of those under the age of 18 and 0.0% of those 65 and older were living below the poverty line.

Timnath has experienced significant population growth in recent years, and was the fastest growing town in Colorado in 2013 (32%) and the fastest growing town in Colorado since the start of the decade (142%).

Notable people
Jean Bethke Elshtain, political philosopher

References

External links

 Town of Timnath website
 CDOT map of the Town of Timnath
 Town of Timnath Google My Business

Towns in Larimer County, Colorado
Towns in Colorado